The Lădăuți is a left tributary of the river Buzău in Romania. It discharges into the Buzău near Sita Buzăului.

References

Rivers of Romania
Rivers of Covasna County